Nicolás "Nico" Richotti (born 17 October 1986) is an Argentine professional basketball player. At a height of 1.84 m (6'0 ") tall, he plays at both the point guard and shooting guard positions, with shooting guard being his main position.

Professional career
Richotti started his career in 2004 at Hindú Resistencia of the Argentine Second League. In 2005, he moved to Italy, on a one-year contract with Bari, in the Italian minor divisions.
In 2008, after playing three years in the Italian minors, Richotti signed with the Spanish fourth division team CB San Isidro. One year later, he joined the Real Madrid reserve team, Real Madrid B, before moving to CB Canarias in 2010, where he became the team's captain in 2015.

On September 23, 2019, he has signed with Montakit Fuenlabrada of the Liga Endesa. 

In August 2021, Richotti signed with Úrvalsdeild karla club Njarðvík. On 18 September he scored 14 points in Njarðvík's 97-93 win against Stjarnan in the Icelandic Cup final, ending the clubs 16 year major title draught. On 2 October 2021, he scored 18 points in Njarðvík's 100–113 loss against Þór Þorlákshöfn in the Icelandic Super Cup. On 7 January 2022, he scored a season high 29 points in a win against Þór Þorlákshöfn. For the season, he averaged 14.4 points, 4.4 rebounds and 5.2 assists.

In October 2022, Richotti resigned with Njarðvík for the 2022–2023 season. On 15 December 2022, he scored 27 points in a victory against KR.

National team career
Richotti made his first appearances with the senior men's Argentine national team at the 2013 Stanković Continental Champions' Cup. He won the silver medal at the 2014 South American Championship.

He also joined the Argentina senior national team for the 2015 Pan American Games, the 2015 Tuto Marchand Cup, and the 2015 FIBA Americas Championship, where he won a silver medal.

Trophies

With CB Canarias
LEB Oro (Spanish 2nd Division): (1)
2012
Copa Príncipe de Asturias (Spanish Prince's Cup) (Spanish 2nd Cup): (1)
2012
FIBA Champions League: (1)
2016–17

References

External links

Liga Endesa Profile 
FIBA Archive Profile
FIBA Game Center Profile
Eurobasket.com Profile
Draftexpress.com Profile
Champions League Profile
Icelandic statistics at Icelandic Basketball Association

1986 births
Living people
Argentine expatriate basketball people in Iceland
Argentine expatriate basketball people in Spain
Argentine men's basketball players
Argentine people of Italian descent
Basketball players at the 2015 Pan American Games
CB Canarias players
Italian expatriate basketball people in Iceland
Italian expatriate basketball people in Spain
Italian men's basketball players
Liga ACB players
Pan American Games competitors for Argentina
Point guards
Njarðvík men's basketball players
Shooting guards
Sportspeople from Bahía Blanca
Úrvalsdeild karla (basketball) players